The 1997 Calder Cup playoffs of the American Hockey League began on April 18, 1997. The sixteen teams that qualified, eight from each conference, played best-of-five series for division semifinals and best-of-seven series for division finals and conference finals. The conference champions played a best-of-seven series for the Calder Cup. The Calder Cup Final ended on June 13, 1997, with the Hershey Bears defeating the Hamilton Bulldogs four games to one to win the eighth Calder Cup in team history. Hershey's Mike McHugh won the Jack A. Butterfield Trophy as AHL playoff MVP.

Hershey set an AHL playoff record by scoring 35 powerplay goals during the 1997 Calder Cup playoffs. Furthermore, Game 2 of the Mid-Atlantic Division final between Hershey and Philadelphia set an AHL playoff record for the most penalty minutes in one game by both teams with 350 (Hershey, 179; Philadelphia, 171). In addition, Hershey's Jean-François Labbé set an AHL playoff record for goaltenders by playing in 23 games in one playoff.

Playoff seeds
After the 1996–97 AHL regular season, 16 teams qualified for the playoffs. The top four teams from each division qualified for the playoffs. However, due to the uneven number of teams in the each conference, it was possible for the fifth-placed team in the five team divisions to crossover to the playoffs for the four team divisions. This could only happen if the fifth-placed team in a five team division earned more points than the fourth-placed team in the four team division in the same conference. In this case, the fifth-placed team from the five team division would play in place of the fourth-placed team from the four team division in that part of the playoff bracket. The Philadelphia Phantoms were the Southern Conference regular season champions and also had the best overall regular season record. The Rochester Americans were the Northern Conference regular season champions.

Northern Conference

Canadian Division
St. John's Maple Leafs – 88 points
Saint John Flames – 72 points
Hamilton Bulldogs – 69 points

Empire State Division
Rochester Americans – Northern Conference regular season champions, 90 points
Adirondack Red Wings – 90 points
Albany River Rats – 90 points
Syracuse Crunch – 74 points
Binghamton Rangers – 69 points (Played in the Canadian Division bracket by virtue of earning more points than the fourth-placed team in that division)

Southern Conference

New England Division
Worcester IceCats – 100 points
Springfield Falcons – 96 points
Portland Pirates – 91 points
Providence Bruins – 75 points

Mid-Atlantic Division
Philadelphia Phantoms – Southern Conference regular season champions; Best overall regular season record, 111 points
Hershey Bears – 101 points
Kentucky Thoroughblades – 81 points
Baltimore Bandits – 73 points

Bracket

In each round the team that earned more points during the regular season receives home ice advantage, meaning they receive the "extra" game on home-ice if the series reaches the maximum number of games. There is no set series format due to arena scheduling conflicts and travel considerations.

Division Semifinals
Note 1: All times are in Eastern Time (UTC−4).
Note 2: Game times in italics signify games to be played only if necessary.
Note 3: Home team is listed first.

Northern Conference

Canadian Division

(C1) St. John's Maple Leafs vs. (E5) Binghamton Rangers

(C2) Saint John Flames vs. (C3) Hamilton Bulldogs

Empire State Division

(E1) Rochester Americans vs. (E4) Syracuse Crunch

(E2) Adirondack Red Wings vs. (E3) Albany River Rats

Southern Conference

New England Division

(N1) Worcester IceCats vs. (N4) Providence Bruins

(N2) Springfield Falcons vs. (N3) Portland Pirates

Mid-Atlantic Division

(M1) Philadelphia Phantoms vs. (M4) Baltimore Bandits

(M2) Hershey Bears vs. (M3) Kentucky Thoroughblades

Division Finals

Northern Conference

Canadian Division

(C1) St. John's Maple Leafs vs. (C3) Hamilton Bulldogs

Empire State Division

(E1) Rochester Americans vs. (E3) Albany River Rats

Southern Conference

New England Division

(N2) Springfield Falcons vs. (N4) Providence Bruins

Mid-Atlantic Division

(M1) Philadelphia Phantoms vs. (M2) Hershey Bears

Conference finals

Northern Conference

(E3) Albany River Rats vs. (C3) Hamilton Bulldogs

Southern Conference

(M2) Hershey Bears vs. (N2) Springfield Falcons

Calder Cup Final

(M2) Hershey Bears vs. (C3) Hamilton Bulldogs

See also
1996–97 AHL season
List of AHL seasons

References

Calder Cup
Calder Cup playoffs